Highway 77 is an east-west highway in northern Israel.  It crosses the Lower Galilee in the region of the Beit Netofa Valley. The road leads from the Tel Qashish Interchange nearby Yokneam Illit to Tiberias. It is 48 km long. Its western section, from the Tel Qashish Interchange to the Golani Interchange is a freeway.

Junctions & Interchanges on the highway

Places of interest on Highway 77
 HaSolelim forest nature reserve
 Monument to the Bedouin soldier
 Eshkol Reservoir
 The church and the grave of Rabban Shimon ben Gamliel in Kafr Kanna
 Memorial to the Golani Brigade at the Golani Interchange
 Lavi forest
 The Sea of Galilee

See also
List of highways in Israel
Lower Galilee
Beit Netofa Valley

References

77